The James Aronson Award for Social Justice Journalism has been awarded since 1990 to honor Hunter College Professor, James Aronson.
This award honors original, written English-language reporting from the U.S. media that brings to light widespread injustices, their human consequences, underlying causes, and possible reforms. This includes but is not limited to: discrimination, exploitation, violations of human rights or civil liberties, and environmental degradation. The Grambs Aronson Cartooning with a Conscience Award is named for his wife, (Blanche Mary) Grambs Aronson. The award, which was established in 1998, seeks to honor Hunter College students who demonstrate prowess in editorial cartooning in either print or digital media.

List of winners

References

American journalism awards
Awards established in 1990
Hunter College
Social justice